Gil Troy (born 1961) is an American presidential historian and a popular commentator on politics and other issues. He is a professor of history at McGill University. Troy is the author of nine books, and the editor of two. He writes a column for The Daily Beast on forgotten history, putting current events in historical perspective and is a columnist for The Jerusalem Post.

Biography
Troy was born in Queens, New York. He is the brother of Dan Troy and Tevi David Troy. He attended Jamaica High School, and received his bachelor's degree, master's degree, and doctorate from Harvard University.

Academic career
Troy taught history and literature at Harvard University from 1988 to 1990. He has taught history at McGill University since 1990. Troy has authored seven books on the American presidency and the history of presidential campaigning, including biographies of Ronald Reagan and Hillary Clinton, and edited two others, including a revised edition of a comprehensive reference guide to American presidential elections previously edited by noted historian Arthur M. Schlesinger, Jr.  He has written numerous articles on the presidency and presidential elections that have appeared in The New York Times, The Wilson Quarterly, and other newspapers, magazines and journals. He has served as visiting scholar at the Bipartisan Policy Center and on the advisory board of the History News Network. The History News Network designated him one of the first "top young historians," and Maclean's Magazine has repeatedly identified him as one of McGill's "popular Profs."

Zionist activism
Troy is a prominent activist in the debate over Zionism and the future of Israel. He has been a Shalom Hartman Center Research Fellow and helped found the center's Engaging Israel Program. His articles on the subject have appeared in The New Republic and elsewhere, and he has written two books, Why I am a Zionist and Moynihan's Moment: America's Fight Against Zionism as Racism, which David G. Dalin, writing in the National Review, called "beautifully written, and rich in its insight and analysis ... the definitive account of this episode and of why its legacy is an enduring one." Jewish Ideas Daily designated Moynihan's Moment one of its "best books" of 2012, it was the winner of a 2014 J.I. Segal Award in the category of English Non-Fiction Award on a Jewish Theme, and his article "Democracy, Judaism, and War" won a 2014 Simon Rockower Award for Excellence in Single Commentary.

Personal life
Troy is married to lawyer Linda Adams, daughter of Canadian real estate investor Marcel Adams.

Published works

Books
 The Zionist Ideas; Visions for the Jewish Homeland — Then, Now, Tomorrow (2018)
 The Age of Clinton: America in the 1990s. St. Martin's Press, 2015.  
  Moynihan's Moment: America's Fight Against Zionism as Racism. Oxford University Press, 2012. 
  History of American Presidential Elections 1789–2008. (4th edition, Arthur M. Schlesinger, Jr.,  Gil Troy & Fred L. Israel, editors). Facts on File, 2011. 
 Living in the Eighties. (Gil Troy & Vincent J. Cannato, editors). Oxford University Press, 2009. 
 The Reagan Revolution: A Very Short Introduction. Oxford University Press, 2009. 
 Hillary Rodham Clinton: Polarizing First Lady. University Press of Kansas, 2008. 
 Leading from the Center: Why Moderates Make the Best Presidents. Basic Books, 2008.  (In paperback: Why Moderates Make the Best Presidents: From George Washington to Barack Obama. University Press of Kansas, 2012. )
 Morning in America: How Ronald Reagan Invented the 1980s. Princeton University Press, 2007. 
 Why I Am a Zionist: Israel, Jewish Identity and the Challenges of Today. Bronfman Jewish Education Center, 2002. 
 Affairs of State: The Rise and Rejection of the Presidential Couple Since World War II. Free Press, 1997. . (In paperback: Mr. & Mrs. President: From the Trumans to the Clintons. University Press of Kansas, 2000. )
 See How They Ran: The Changing Role of the Presidential Candidate. (Revised and expanded edition.) Harvard University Press, 1996.

Articles
 "Campaign Stops" columns in The New York Times
 "Center Field" columns in The Jerusalem Post
 "Open Zion" blogs on The Daily Beast
 "The Campaign Triumphant," "Bury the Hatchet" and "Money and Politics: The Oldest Connection" in The Wilson Quarterly
 "No, Israel Isn't Turning into an Iran-Style Theocracy"  in The New Republic

References

External links
 Moynihan's Moment book site
 Moynihan's Moment video
 The New York Times "Campaign Stops" columns by Gil Troy
 The Jerusalem Post "Center Field" columns by Gil Troy
 The Daily Beast "Open Zion" blogs by Gil Troy
 Age of Clinton book site

Living people
Harvard University alumni
21st-century American historians
21st-century American male writers
Jewish activists
Historians of the United States
Academic staff of McGill University
Writers on Zionism
Jewish American historians
American male non-fiction writers
1961 births
21st-century American Jews